The Musée de minéralogie (Museum of Mineralogy) is a museum in Strasbourg in the Bas-Rhin department of France. It belongs to the University of Strasbourg, and displays historical collections of minerals. The museum was founded in 1890.

The origin of the mineral collection is the work of a professor of medicine from Strasbourg, Johann Hermann, who had set up a cabinet of curiosities in the 18th century. The museum is home to over 30,000 mineral samples. Gems and stones from France, Germany, the former Soviet Union (most notably Russia), Romania and USA are exhibited. The collections include a cast of the largest single piece of gold ever found (a 68 kg lump of gold, found in Australia).
Also of special interest is the "box with fluorescent stones", with minerals illuminated by ultra-violet rays.

The museum is located in the Paleontology and Mineralogy faculty building of the University of Strasbourg. Two rooms are dedicated to him in a building of the School and Observatory of Earth Sciences (EOST) also housing the Laboratory of Hydrology and Geochemistry.

External links 
Official website

References 

Mineralogie
Mineralogie
Geology museums in France
University museums in France
Natural history museums in France